Coifi or Cofi was the priest of the temple at Goodmanham in the Kingdom of Northumbria in 627.

Bede's description of Coifi is that of the chief of priests in Northumbria; the fact that he is the chief priest suggests that there was some sort of organised pagan priesthood in existence during Coifi's time. Whilst we know very little about Coifi we do at least know of some of the aspects of his priestly life. Bede informs us of some of the restrictions placed upon Coifi as a priest, such as not being allowed to bear arms or ride a stallion.

Coifi was one of the people King Edwin of Northumbria sought for advice on whether to convert to Christianity as preached by Paulinus, chaplain to his Christian queen Ethelburga. It is worth noting that Coifi was a member of the council, the witan, consulted by the king. Coifi declared that the pagan religion he had followed had no advantage, and that he had followed it in ignorance.

Coifi mounted a stallion and rode from the king's council (which according to local tradition was held at the royal summer encampment at Londsborough), to the pagan temple at Goodmanham, where he cast a spear into the altar before setting the building on fire, as the people watched.

Coifi and the Conversion of King Edwin 

Holding a council with the wise men King Edwin asked of every one in particular what he thought of the new doctrine and the new worship that was preached.

To which the chief of his own priests, Coifi, immediately answered: O king, consider what this is which is now preached to us; for I verily declare to you that the religion which we have hitherto professed has, as afar as I can learn, no virtue in it. For none of you people has applied himself more diligently to the worship of our gods than I; and yet there are many who receive greater favors from you, and are more preferred than I, and who are more prosperous in all their undertakings. Now if the gods were good for anything, they would rather forward me, who have been more careful to serve them. If follows, therefore, that if upon examination you find those new doctrines which are now preached to us better and more efficacious, we should immediately receive them without any delay.

Another of the king's chief men, approving of Coifi's words and exhortations, presently added: "The present life of man, O king, seems to me, in comparison with that time which is unknown to us, like to the swift flight of a sparrow through the room wherein you sit at supper in winter amid your officers and ministers, with a good fire in the midst, whilst the storms of rain and snow prevail abroad; the sparrow, I say, flying at one door and immediately out at another, whilst he is within is safe from the wintry storm; but after a short space of fair weather he immediately vanishes out of your sight into the dark winter from which he has emerged. So this life of man appears for a short space, but of what went before or what is to follow we are utterly ignorant. If, therefore, this new doctrine contains something more certain, it seems justly to deserve to be followed."

The other elders, and king's counselors, by divine inspiration, spoke to the same effect. But Coifi added that he wished more attentively to hear Paulinus discourse concerning the God whom he preached. So the bishop having spoken by the king's command at greater length, Coifi, hearing his words, cried out: I have long since been sensible that there was nothing in that which we worshipped, because the more diligently I sought after truth in that worship, the less I found it. But now I freely confess that such evident truth appears in this preaching as can confer on us the gifts of life, of salvation, and of eternal happiness. For which reason I advise, O king, that we instantly abjure and set fire to those temples and altars which we have consecrated without reaping any benefits from them.

In short, the king publicly gave his permission to Paulinus to preach the gospel, and, renouncing idolatry, declared that he received the faith of Christ; and when he inquired of the high priest who should first profane the altars and temples of their idols, with the inclosures that were about them, the high priest answered, I; for who can more properly than myself destroy those things which I worshipped through ignorance, for an example to all others, through the wisdom which has been given me by the true God?

- the Venerable Bede, Ecclesiastical History of the English People.

References

 Arthur Mee's 1000 Heroes, Page 611 (Vol.1), Pages 1323-1326 (Vol.2)

External links
 

7th-century clergy
7th-century deaths
7th-century English people
Anglo-Saxon pagans
Converts to Christianity from pagan religions
Clergy from Yorkshire
History of the East Riding of Yorkshire
Northumbria
People from Market Weighton
Year of birth unknown
Year of death unknown
7th-century Christian clergy